Georg Rusche (1900-1950) was a German political economist and criminologist, co-author with Otto Kirchheimer of Punishment and Social Structure (1939).

He committed suicide in Uxbridge in October 1950.

Works
 'Labor Market and Penal Sanction', 1933
 (with Otto Kirchheimer) Punishment and Social Structure, 1939.

References

1900 births
1950 deaths
German economists
German criminologists
1950 suicides
Suicides in England